Qmusic Limburg is a radio station in the Dutch province of Limburg. It is a joint venture between Qmusic and Bartelet Holding Maastricht B.V., owner of Radio Limburg.

Qmusic had no FM frequencies in the province of Limburg. Through a structure Qmusic can broadcast since 1 June 2014 in the province on a frequency package that is meant for a local radio station. RadioNL previously aired this. 20 hours a day the nationwide variant will be broadcast. Between 9:00 and 13:00, every day a regional program will be broadcast, which will be produced by Qmusic Netherlands, but another presenter. Between 9:00 and 10:00 Het Foute Uur is broadcast like on the national variant. Companies from the province can request their favorite wrong songs. The program between 10:00 and 13:00 was initially presented by Joep Roelofsen, but the baton was taken on 4 August 2014 by Jules van Hest.

See also
 List of radio stations in the Netherlands

References

External links
 Official website 

Radio stations in the Netherlands